The 1954–55 Israel State Cup (Gvia HaMedina) was the 18th season of Israel's nationwide football cup competition and the third after the Israeli Declaration of Independence.

Matches began on 22 January 1955, but was not concluded until the end of the 1954–55 season, and the later rounds were held in autumn 1955, at the beginning of the 1955–56 season. The final was held at the Basa Stadium in Tel Aviv on 19 November 1955. Maccabi Tel Aviv appeared in its fifth consecutive final and after defeating Hapoel Petah Tikva 3–1, won its 8th cup.

Results

First round
First round matches were played between Liga Gimel teams. Matches were held on 22 January 1955. However, since there was a dispute between the Maccabi and Hapoel faction within the IFA, Maccabi teams declined to play their matches.  These matches, completing the round, were played on 19 February 1955.

Second round
Liga Bet teams entered the competition. Matches were held on 26 February 1955. Two ties went into a replay, and one, between Liga Gimel teams Hapoel HaMegabesh and Hapoel Be'er Ya'akov needed a further replay in order to be settled.
The tie between Hapoel Nahariya and Hapoel Beit Lid also proved troublesome. While Nahariya won the match between the team 2–0, a walkover win was given to Beit Lid since the playing field in Nahariya was lacking a fence between the field and the stands. Nahariya appealed the decision and went to civil court in order to obtain an injunction forbidding any further cup matches until the matter is resolved. However, as in the month between the second and the third rounds the appeal was accepted and the original result was restored, there was no delay.

Replays

As the tie between Hapoel Be'er Ya'akov and Hapoel HaMegabesh wasn't settled, a draw of lots were held, in which Hapoel Be'er Ya'akov won.

Third round
Most of Liga Alef teams, which entered the competition on this round, cruised to the next round. Maccabi Petah Tikva found Liga Gimel club Maccabi Shmuel Tel Aviv hard to beat, being saved by a 90th-minute goal to go through, and Hapoel Balfouria needed extra time to win at home against Hapoel Ra'anana.
Most matches were played on 26 March 1955. Two matches, both scheduled to be played in Jerusalem, were postponed due to weather conditions and were finally played on 7 May 1955, both ending with surprise winners, as Liga Gimel club Orthodox Haifa thrashed Hapoel Jerusalem from Liga bet and Liga Aleph club Hapoel Kfar Saba crashing to Liga bet club (and former cup finalist and joint-holder) Maccabi Jerusalem.

Fourth round
The 17 winners from the previous round were drawn to eight ties, with Hapoel Balfouria receiving a bye to an intermediate round. All matches were held on 28 May 1955.

Bye: Hapoel Balfouria

Intermediate round
Of the eight fourth round winners, Hapoel Petah Tikva was drawn to play Hapoel Balfouria. The match was supposed to be played on 9 July 1955, but Balfouria withdrew and Petah Tikva was given a walkover win.

Quarter-finals
The 1955–56 season opened with the task of completing last season's cup competition. Three of the four ties, all played on 27 August 1955, yielded a decisive result, with Maccabi Tel Aviv registering its third consecutive 6–0 win, while the other tie was only settled after extra time was played.

Semi-finals

Final

Notes

References
100 Years of Football 1906-2006, Elisha Shohat (Israel), 2006

Israel State Cup
State Cup
State Cup
Israel State Cup seasons